Ebor is an unincorporated community in southwestern Manitoba, Canada. It is approximately 31 kilometers (19 miles) southwest of Virden, Manitoba in the Rural Municipality of Pipestone.

References 

Unincorporated communities in Westman Region